Zelia is a genus of bristle flies.

Zelia may also refer to:

 Zelia (given name)
 Tropical Cyclone Zelia (1998)
 Severe Tropical Cyclone Zelia (2011)
 169 Zelia, an asteroid